Giovanni delle Bande Nere (P433) is the fourth ship of Paolo Thaon di Revel-class offshore patrol vessel built for the Italian Navy.

Development and design 
The ship is the first full capability variant of the PPA design. Its armament will include 16 Aster 15 and Aster 30 surface-to-air missiles, Teseo anti-ship missiles, two triple launchers for MU90 torpedoes, a 127 mm and 76mm turret and two remotely operated 25 mm mounts. Sensors include an ATAS towed sonar for anti-submarine warfare and a Black Snake antenna for torpedo detection, as well as ODLS 20 decoy launchers with anti-missile and anti-torpedo countermeasures. Like other PPAs, the main radar is a Leonardo Kronos with four fixed panels.

The Italian Navy ordered the new MBDA TESEO MK/2E heavy-duty missile (TESEO "EVO"), a long-range anti-ship missilewith also strategic land attack capability. The missile will have a new terminal "head" with dual RF seeker (Radio Frequency) and, presumably, given the need to even attack ground targets, IIR (Imaging IR). Compared to the predecessor OTOMAT/TESEO, the TESEO "EVO" MK/2E has a double range or more than 360 km. Former OTOMAT is accredited for a range of action of more than 180 km.

Construction and career
Giovanni delle Bande Nere was laid down on 28 August 2019 at Fincantieri Muggiano and was launched on 12 February 2022. It is expected to be commissioned in October 2024. The ship was reported on sea trials as of August 2022.

References

External links
 Pattugliatori Polivalenti di Altura Marina Militare website

Ships built by Fincantieri